This is a list of all fixed-wing and rotary-wing aircraft operated by the Argentine Air Force since its formation in 1945, and by its predecessor (the Army Aviation Service) since 1912 to 1945. 
Prototypes and aircraft evaluated but not used operationally are excluded. Aircraft are listed under the main role in which they were used for most of their operational life.
For the current inventory see the list of active aircraft of the Argentine Air Force.

Fixed-wing aircraft

Rotary-wing aircraft

Footnotes

References

Citations

Bibliography
Books
 

 
Journal articles

External links 
  List of Argentine Air Force's current and former aircraft in "Aeromilitaria" website (retrieved 2009-05-13)
  List of Argentine Air Force's current and former aircraft in "Gaceta Aeronautica" website (retrieved 2014-05-31)

Argentine Air Force
Argentine Air Force

Argentine military-related lists